Andrew Dunsire Burton (1884 –29 July 1962) was a Scottish professional association football player in the years prior to the First World War. He made over 40 appearances in Scottish League, over 200 appearances in The Football League and played in the Southern League.

Career
Born in Lochgelly in Scotland, Andy Burton featured prominently in Bristol City's successes in the first decade of the 20th century under Manager Harry Thickett. He played for local clubs in Scotland including Thompson's Rovers & Lochgelly United before joining Motherwell making 25 appearances scoring 6 goals for the Scottish First Division team. Harry Thickett signed Burton in July 1905 for Bristol City in the Second Division. He made his league debut in the 1–5 defeat at Manchester United on 2 September 1905 immediately proceeding the record run of 14 successive league wins by Bristol City. Burton made 37 appearances at inside left scoring eight goals replacing Arthur Capes, who moved to Swindon Town in the summer, in 1905–06 for the "Robins" when Bristol City finished as Second Division champions. In the next season in the First Division Burton contributed 13 goals from 34 appearances as the regular inside left missing only the final four league games in 1906–07 as City finished as First Division runners up to Newcastle United. Burton scored twice in each of three successive home games during December 1906. Burton made a further 32 appearances scoring nine goals in 1907–08 as the regular inside left. In the three seasons 1905–1908, Burton formed a part of a great trio of City goalscoring forwards, Billy Maxwell at inside right scored 55 goals, centre forward Sammy Gilligan netted 51 goals and Burton contributed 30 goals of the 207 league goals scored in this period. Maxwell and Gilligan gradually moved on but Andy Burton continued as inside left in the next two seasons both spent in the First Division. In 1908–09, Burton made 35 appearances scoring eight goals and played in all of the ten FA Cup ties appearing at inside left in the 1909 FA Cup Final losing 0–1 to Manchester United at the Crystal Palace, the only final appearance to date by Bristol City. He made 33 appearances scoring three goals in 1909–10 and shared the inside left duties with Alec Logan with 21appearances scoring four goals in 1910–11 the season when Bristol City were relegated back to the Second Division before leaving City in July 1911 to join First Division Everton. Burton made his debut on the opening day of the season scoring once in a 2–2 draw v Tottenham Hotspur. He failed to establish himself in the Everton team and after 12 appearances and four goals moved to Southern League Reading. At Reading in the First Division of the Southern League Burton made 32 appearances scoring 11 goals in 1912–13 as Reading finished eighth of 20 clubs. The following season Burton made 36 appearances scoring five goal as Reading rose to fourth place in the table. Burton next appeared for East Fife in 1921–22 in the Scottish Second Division making 23 appearances scoring two goals. Andy Burton later coached in Belgium.

Honours
with Bristol City
Football League Second Division champion: 1905–06
Football League First Division runner-up: 1906–07
FA Cup runner-up: 1909

References

1884 births
1962 deaths
People from Lochgelly
Scottish footballers
Lochgelly United F.C. players
Motherwell F.C. players
Bristol City F.C. players
Everton F.C. players
Reading F.C. players
East Fife F.C. players
Scottish Football League players
English Football League players
Association football forwards
FA Cup Final players
Footballers from Fife